Baitutan is a town in the northeast of the county-level city of Liling, Zhuzhou, Hunan, China.

Toponymy 
The town's name, which literally translates to 'white rabbit pond', is derived from a portion of the local Chengtan River with large rocks at the bottom said to look like white rabbits.

History 
Upon the establishment of the People's Republic of China, the area of Baitutan belonged to Hunan's First District. Baitutan District was created in 1952. Baitutan was established as Tutan Township in 1956. Tutan Township was merged into the Pukou People's Commune in 1958. The Baitutan People's Commune was established in 1961. In 1984, people's communes were abolished, and Baitutan became a township. Baitutan was upgraded to a town in 1985.

Xinghu Village, from the now-defunct town of Nanqiao, as well as the villages of Hetian (荷田), Boda (柏大) and Changqing (长庆) from the now-defunct town of Fuli were merged into Baitutan on November 26, 2015.

Geography 
Baitutan is located in the northeast of Liling,  from its center, and is bordered by the prefecture-level city of Pingxiang in neighboring Jiangxi province to the east.

Administrative divisions 
Baitutan administers 2 residential communities and 10 administrative villages.

Residential communities 
Baitutan administers the following 2 residential communities:

 Baishi Community
 Jinniu Community

Administrative villages 
Baitutan administers the following 10 villages:

 Tianxin Village
 Tunxi Village
 Zhutang Village
 Huangjia Village
 Qiaoling Village
 Shanshui Village
 Quanyuan Village
 Changqing Village
 Hetian VIllage
 Boda Village

Demographics 
Baitutan had a population of 35,806 per the 2010 Chinese Census, up slightly from an estimated 34,500 in 2005. Baitutan had a recorded population of 32,360 in the 2000 Chinese Census.

Economy 
The town serves as a center for trade in the eastern portion of Liling.

Transport 
National Highway 106 passes through Baitutan.

References

External links

Divisions of Liling